Bushey Mead is a small district of the London Borough of Merton, forming a small 'ladder' of terraced streets between Wimbledon Chase railway station and Raynes Park railway station. The housing was built in several steps during the period circa 1890 - 1913.

References

Areas of London
Districts of the London Borough of Merton